A city of regional significance in Ukraine was a type of second-level administrative division or municipality, the other type being raions (districts). In the first-level division of oblasts, they were referred to as cities of oblast significance; in the first-level autonomous republic of Crimea, they were cities of republican significance. The designation was created with the introduction of oblasts in 1932. It was abolished in a 2020 reform that merged raions together and integrated the city municipalities into them.

Such city municipality was complex and usually combined the city proper and adjacent populated places. The city of regional (oblast) significance was governed by a city council known as mis'krada, which was chaired by a mayor. There were instances where a municipality might have included only the city alone (city proper), while in others instances a municipality might have consisted of its own subdivisions such as districts in city, similarly to the cities with special status or even other cities which carried the designation of cities of district significance.

Definition

Each region had at least one city of regional significance as its administrative center. A city was usually granted the status for being an economic and cultural center that has a developed industry, utilities, a considerable amount of state provided housing, and a population of over 50,000, and if for further economic and social development of a city it was appropriate to establish a direct management by regional organizations.

In some cases, a city with a population of less than 50,000 could be a city of regional significance if it had industrial, social-cultural, and historical significance, or a propensity for further economical and social development and population increase. These exceptions were usually granted on a decision of the Supreme Council of Ukraine – the Verkhovna Rada.

The city could be divided into districts at the city's authorities' discretion. Along with the raions of a region, the cities of regional significance are the second level of administrative-territorial division of Ukraine. Beside having districts, the city can be divided into various municipal councils (rada, often considered its extended metropolitan area and suburbs) such as smaller city councils, town councils, or rural councils. A city of regional significance can simply be composed of one settlement itself.

In 2012, there were 178 cities of regional significance across the different regions of Ukraine, ranging from the Donetsk Region, which has the highest number of cities at 28. On average there are seven cities in each oblast or Crimea.

List of cities by oblast
Population statistics are from the 2001 Ukrainian Census. An asterisk (*) indicates cities that have district division.

Cherkasy Oblast

Chernihiv Oblast

Chernivtsi Oblast

Crimea

Dnipropetrovsk Oblast

Donetsk Oblast

Ivano-Frankivsk Oblast

Kyiv Oblast

* - Not shown on map

Kirovohrad Oblast

Kharkiv Oblast

Kherson Oblast

Khmelnytskyi Oblast

Luhansk Oblast

Lviv Oblast

Mykolaiv Oblast

Odesa Oblast

Poltava Oblast

Rivne Oblast

Sumy Oblast

Ternopil Oblast

Vinnytsia Oblast

Volyn Oblast

Zakarpattia Oblast

Zaporizhzhia Oblast

Zhytomyr Oblast

See also

 Administrative divisions of Ukraine
 City of district significance (Ukraine), similar category for smaller cities
 Consolidated city-county
 List of places named after people (Ukraine)

External links
 
 

 
Regional significance
Ukraine, Regional Cities
Regional
Subdivisions of Ukraine